Duck Soup to Nuts is a 1944 Warner Bros. Looney Tunes cartoon directed by Friz Freleng. The cartoon was released on May 27, 1944, and stars Daffy Duck and Porky Pig.

Plot
Daffy is relaxing in a pond with a group of mallards. Suddenly a gunshot goes off, and all the ducks dunk their heads underwater for cover (Daffy puts a swimming cap on his head before similarly dunking his head). Porky enters and lets off another shot, which sends the other ducks flying away.

Porky then takes aim at Daffy and orders him out. When Daffy comes out (still with his feet in the air), he quickly disarms Porky and tells the hunter that he is no ordinary duck and then shows this off by "singing", "dancing", and "acting" (flashing his contract with Warner Bros.). When this gag is over, Daffy offers to read the bumps on Porky's head, providing the bumps himself! Porky then tries holding a shotgun to Daffy, but Daffy responds to this threat by looking inside the shotgun to see a woman in a bathing suit. When Porky takes a look, he sees Daffy in the same pose! Porky shoots Daffy out, and Daffy runs back to the pond, where Porky cannot chase him.

Daffy is underwater singing when he notices Porky has jumped in with a diving helmet. Daffy then walks up to Porky as "the Fuller Brush Man!", and knocks on Porky's helmet. When Porky tells him to "come in," Daffy opens the front of the helmet, causing Porky to jump out and start bailing out the water from the lake with a bucket. Eventually, all the water is gone, and Daffy flips around like a fish out of water. When Porky refuses to 'believe' that Daffy is a fish, Daffy counters that he does not believe Porky is a pig; he believes that Porky is an eagle. After the gag where Daffy switches what Porky says, Porky decides to prove that he is an eagle by jumping off a tree. When this does not work, Porky uses up all his ammunition trying to shoot Daffy. However, he still has his "trusty six-shooter".

Before Porky can kill Daffy, Daffy asks to say goodbye to his wife and kids. Letting out a Tarzan-type yell (and then coughing at the end), his wife and three kids come to say a tearful goodbye. Porky then walks away, feeling that he would be a rat if he were to shoot Daffy. Just as he is out of sight, the "wife and kids" reveal themselves to be four friends of Daffy's, all with derbies and cigars. Their laughter is interrupted by Porky's shooting at them with his shotgun, and all five of them jump around, "hoo-hoo"-ing as they jump into the distance.

Home media
VHS - Viddy-Oh! For Kids Cartoon Festivals: The Best of Bugs Bunny and Friends
VHS - Viddy-Oh! For Kids Cartoon Festivals: Porky Pig and Daffy Duck Cartoon Festival Featuring "Tick Tock Tuckered"
VHS - Cartoon Moviestars: Just Plain Daffy
LaserDisc - The Golden Age of Looney Tunes, Vol. 1, Side 6: Friz Freleng
VHS - The Golden Age of Looney Tunes, Vol. 6: Friz Freleng
DVD - Looney Tunes Golden Collection: Volume 2, Disc 3

See also
 List of Daffy Duck cartoons
 Porky Pig filmography

Notes
This cartoon was re-released in the Blue Ribbon Merrie Melodies program on January 6, 1951. The original titles are said to be lost.

References

External links

 

1944 films
1944 animated films
Looney Tunes shorts
Short films directed by Friz Freleng
1940s American animated films
Films about hunters
Daffy Duck films
Porky Pig films
Films scored by Carl Stalling
Films produced by Leon Schlesinger